Caril Ann Fugate (born July 30, 1943) is the youngest female in United States history to have been tried and convicted of first-degree murder. She was the adolescent girlfriend of spree killer Charles Starkweather, being just 14 years old when his murders took place in 1958. She was convicted as his accomplice and sentenced to life imprisonment, being paroled after 17 years in 1976.

Background to crime spree
Fugate lived in Lincoln, Nebraska, with her mother and stepfather. In 1956, at age 13, she formed a relationship with Charles Starkweather, a high school dropout five years her senior. They met through Caril's sister, Barbara, who was dating Starkweather's friend, Bob von Busch. On January 21, 1958, Starkweather shot and killed Fugate's stepfather, Marion Bartlett, and her mother, Velda. Starkweather then hit Fugate's younger half-sister, Betty Jean, and stabbed her in the neck. Fugate claimed she came home to find Starkweather there alone, waiting for her with a gun. She said he told her that her family was being held hostage and that if she did exactly as he said, her family would be safe. During the next six days, the pair lived in the house and turned away all visitors, which made Fugate's relatives suspicious. The bodies were found later in outbuildings on the property.

Cross-state crime spree
Starkweather and Fugate then fled, driving across Nebraska and into Wyoming on a murder spree that claimed six more lives before they were arrested. She admitted holding a .410 gauge shotgun on a young high school couple, Robert Jensen and Carol King.

Sentencing
Starkweather was sentenced to death and executed in the electric chair on June 25, 1959. He insisted that although he had personally killed most of the victims, Fugate had murdered several as well. Although she continued to maintain her innocence, she was tried and convicted for her role in the murder spree. Based on evidence presented that Fugate had opportunities to leave her captivity, and Starkweather's own testimony, the jury found her testimony that she was Starkweather's hostage not credible. She was sentenced to life imprisonment at the Nebraska Correctional Center for Women in York, Nebraska. In 1973, the Nebraska Board of Pardons commuted Fugate's sentence to 30–50 years, making her eligible for parole. Governor J. James Exon and Secretary of State Allen Beermann voted in favor of the commutation, while Attorney General Clarence A. H. Meyer dissented.

Release from prison
Considered to be a model prisoner, Fugate was paroled on June 20, 1976 from York Women's Reformatory in York, Nebraska, after serving 18 years incarceration.    She lived for a time in the Lansing, Michigan, area after being paroled. Following her release, Fugate worked as a janitorial assistant and a nanny. She has since retired.

In 2007, Fugate married Fredrick Clair, a machinist who also worked as a weather observer for the National Weather Service. Their most recent city of residence was Hillsdale, Michigan. 

Fugate was seriously injured on August 5, 2013, in a single-vehicle accident near Tekonsha, Michigan. Her husband, who was driving their sport utility vehicle when it went off the road and overturned, died at the scene.

Fugate, going by her married name of Caril Ann Clair, was denied a pardon by the Nebraska Board of Pardons in February 2020. Her pardon application was supported by relatives of the murder victims. She maintained her innocence in the 1958 slayings, and requested a pardon to "alleviate the burden" of being known as a convicted killer. Her pardon was denied because the role of a pardon is to restore a felon's rights and because her request was too broad for the parole board.

In popular culture

Film and television

The Starkweather–Fugate case inspired the films The Sadist (1963), Badlands (1973), Kalifornia (1993), Natural Born Killers (1994) and Starkweather (2004). Fugate was portrayed by Fairuza Balk in the made-for-TV biographical film Murder in the Heartland (1993), with Tim Roth starring as Starkweather. Stark Raving Mad (1981), a film starring Russell Fast and Marcie Severson, provides a fictionalized account of the Starkweather–Fugate murder spree.

Fugate appeared on a 1983 episode of Lie Detector hosted by F. Lee Bailey.

The 1996 Peter Jackson film The Frighteners features central plot elements with characters almost identical to Starkweather and Fugate, who commit a murder spree. The fourth episode, "Dangerous Liaisons", of season four from the ID series Deadly Women (aired September 2, 2010) was about the Starkweather–Fugate murders. The first episode, "Teenage Wasteland", of season four from the Investigation Discovery series A Crime to Remember (aired December 6, 2016) portrays the murders and subsequent trial. "The Thirteenth Step", the January 11, 2011, episode of Criminal Minds, depicts newlyweds on a North Dakota-Montana killing spree similar to the Starkweather–Fugate case.

An investigative true-crime documentary miniseries that portrayed Fugate as the titular "12th Victim" of Starkweather was released on Showtime in February 2023.

Literature
The 1974 book Caril is an unauthorized biography of Fugate written by Ninette Beaver, B.K. Ripley (pen name of Alexandra Ripley), and Patrick Trese. Liza Ward, the granddaughter of victims C. Lauer and Clara Ward, wrote the 2004 novel Outside Valentine, based on the events of the Starkweather–Fugate murder-spree. The book Pro Bono: The 18-Year Defense of Caril Ann Fugate by Jeff McArthur follows Fugate's defense team through the trial and appeals process.

In 2011, art photographer Christian Patterson released Redheaded Peckerwood, a collection of photos taken each January from 2005 to 2010 along the 500 mile route traversed by Starkweather and Fugate. The book includes reproductions of documents and photographs of objects that belonged to Starkweather, Fugate, and their victims.

Music
Bruce Springsteen's 1982 song "Nebraska" is a first-person narrative based on the Starkweather murders.
The San Francisco pop-punk Band J Church's 1994 song "Hate So Real" was based on the Starkweather/Fugate case, including the names of several victims and the line, "Now Caril can't deny me/and to this day I swear/she should be sittin' on my lap when I go to the chair." Additionally, the song "In Vain" from their 1993 release Yellow, Blue and Green used pictures of the two in its artwork.
Nebraska-based electropop trio Icky Blossoms featured a song entitled "Stark Weather" on their self-titled debut album. It is narrated from Starkweather's point of view and includes references to his killing of Fugate's mother, stepfather, and half-sister.
Nicole Dollanganger's song "Nebraska" (featured on her album Flowers of Flesh and Blood) is a retelling of the murders; though Starkweather is never actually named, Fugate is mentioned in a line which states "[he] showed his Caril Ann how to use a knife/picked it up slowly/killed with it twice".
The crime is mentioned in Billy Joel's song "We Didn't Start the Fire" with the line "Starkweather homicide.."
The 2009 Church of Misery song "Badlands (Charles Starkweather & Caril Fugate)" is about the Starkweather murders.

References

External links
 Life magazine article Feb. 10, 1958

1943 births
20th-century American criminals
American female murderers
American people convicted of murder
American prisoners sentenced to life imprisonment
American spree killers
Criminals from Nebraska
Living people
Minors convicted of murder
People convicted of murder by Nebraska
People from Hillsdale, Michigan
People from Lincoln, Nebraska
People paroled from life sentence
Prisoners sentenced to life imprisonment by Nebraska
Criminal duos